He Yong ( 166–189), courtesy name Boqiu, was an official and scholar who lived in the Eastern Han dynasty of China. He was one of the partisans involved in the Disasters of Partisan Prohibitions incidents in 166 and 169. He was born in Nanyang, but later received his education in Luoyang.

References

 Chen, Shou. Records of the Three Kingdoms (Sanguozhi).
 Fan, Ye. Book of the Later Han (Houhanshu).
 Pei, Songzhi. Annotations to Records of the Three Kingdoms (Sanguozhi zhu).

Han dynasty politicians from Henan
Year of death unknown
Politicians from Nanyang, Henan
190s deaths
2nd-century births